Naruto: Ninja Council 2 (known as  in Japan) is an action video game, released for Game Boy Advance and is the second installment in the Ninja Council series. It is based on the popular manga and anime series Naruto by Masashi Kishimoto and is developed by Aspect and Tomy and published by D3 Publisher and Tomy.

Gameplay 

Naruto: Ninja Council 2 is side-scroller game in which the player has to advance through a 2D level while fighting enemy ninja. The levels vary from the original anime locals like Akagahara and the third exam stadium to some new settings like a cave system. The player is able to double-jump and teleport up and sideways to get to places that are normally out of reach. The game also features special levels in which the character's speed doubles and is asked to run through the whole level while collecting leaf symbols in a specific time. The playable characters are Naruto Uzumaki, Sasuke Uchiha and Sakura Haruno, and it is also possible to unlock Rock Lee. The player is able to swap between characters using the left trigger, and each one has a separate life bar, however when a health package is picked up by one character, it affects the whole party. In certain points of the game however, the player is not able to switch between one or two of the characters, which results in a higher difficulty level.

Combat is performed by using the attack button continuously. Jutsus can be performed by a simple combination of movement and attack buttons. Each character (Besides Lee) has three sets of Jutsus: Naruto can use his sexy jutsu, summoning jutsu and "Uzumaki Barrage". Sakura's jutsus are Speed boost, "Chaa!!" Barrage and timed "Chaa!!" Barrage. Ninja tools can also be acquired, and they are thrown using the attack button. Using scrolls that are scattered throughout the levels will result in one of the anime characters to appear and perform one of his Jutsus.

Plot 

Ninja Council 2 is based on the anime series episodes 22 to 80, however it also features a new mission in which the three ninjas are asked to deliver a scroll. Orochimaru steals the scroll and while attempting to retrieve the scroll the player finds out that Orochimaru requested the scroll in the first place only to watch Sasuke.The game's story is told via "cut-scenes". In these cut-scenes the character who is speaking is shown by a large picture of him on the top of the screen while the dialogue is presented as a text on the bottom of the screen. It also features two multiplayer modes which are played via GBA Link Cable: Versus and Co-Op.

Reception 

The game received "mixed" reviews according to the review aggregation website Metacritic.

See also 
List of Naruto video games
Naruto anime and manga

References

External links 

2004 video games
Aspect Co. games
Game Boy Advance games
Game Boy Advance-only games
Naruto video games
Tomy games
Multiplayer and single-player video games
Video games developed in Japan